Woodstock School is a school in Landour / Mussoorie, Uttarakhand, India.

Woodstock School may also refer to:

 Woodstock Day School, Saugerties, New York
 Woodstock Elementary School (disambiguation)
 Woodstock High School (disambiguation)

See also 
 Woodstock College
 Woodstock Elementary School (disambiguation)
 Woodstock High School (disambiguation)